Skorradalsvatn is a lake in the west of Iceland. It is situated in a narrow valley between the Hvalfjörður and the valley Reykholtsdalur (see Reykholt). Its length is about 15 km.

Around the lake there are some high mountains, for example Skarðsheiði . Unusually for Iceland, the shores of the lake are quite forested due to reforestation started by a governmental initiative. Consequently, the valley looks a bit like some regions in the Alps, for example near Salzburg in Austria.

The lake is also a reservoir so that the level of the water surface has been raised.

There are no villages on the shores, but many of summer houses.

See also
 List of lakes of Iceland

References

Lakes of Iceland